Reginald Leigh Dugmore (20 November 189116 June 1967), known professionally as Reginald Denny, was an English actor, aviator, and UAV pioneer.

Acting career
Born Reginald Leigh Dugmore on 20 November 1891 in Richmond, Surrey, England (part of Greater London since 1965), he came from a theatrical family; his father was actor and opera singer W.H. Denny. 

In 1899, he began his stage career in A Royal Family and starred in several London productions from age seven to twelve. He attended St. Francis Xavier College in Mayfield, Sussex, but, at 16, he ran away from school to train as a pugilist with Sir Harry Preston at the National Sporting Club. He also appeared in several British stage productions touring the music halls of England of The Merry Widow. 

In 1911, he went to the United States to appear in Henry B. Harris's stage production of The Quaker Girl, then joined the Bandmann Opera Company as a baritone touring India and the Far East India where he performed for Krishna Raja Wadiyar IV.

Although he worked in "flickers" during 1911 and 1912, Reginald officially began his film career in 1915 with the World Film Company and made films both in the United States and Britain until the 1960s. Among the numerous stage productions in which he starred, Reginald appeared in John Barrymore's 1920 Broadway production of Richard III; the two actors became friends and starred in several films together including Sherlock Holmes (1922), Hamlet (1933), Romeo and Juliet (1936), and Paramount's Bulldog Drummond series (1937–1938). 

Denny was a well-known actor in silent films, and with the advent of talkies he became a character actor. He played the lead role in a number of his earlier films, generally as a comedic Englishman in such works as Private Lives (1931) and later had reasonably steady work as a supporting actor in dozens of films, including The Little Minister (1934) with Katharine Hepburn, Anna Karenina (1935) with Greta Garbo, Alfred Hitchcock's Rebecca (1940) and the Frank Sinatra crime caper film Assault on a Queen (1966). He made frequent appearances in television during the 1950s and 1960s. His last role was in Batman (1966) as Commodore Schmidlapp. In 2020, Kino Lorber released 4K restorations on DVD and Blu-ray of three of Denny's silent comedies: The Reckless Age, Skinner's Dress Suit, and What Happened to Jones? in The Reginald Denny Collection.

Aviation career

Denny served as an observer/gunner during the First World War in the new wartime Royal Air Force.

In the 1920s he performed as a stunt pilot with the 13 Black Cats and loaned his WWI Sopwith Snipe biplane to Howard Hughes for use in Hell's Angels (1927). In the early 1930s, Denny became interested in free-flight model airplanes. In 1934, he and oil tycoon Max Whittier's son, Paul Whittier, formed Reginald Denny Industries and opened a model plane shop, which became a chain known as the Reginald Denny Hobby Shop, now California Hobby Distributors.

He designed his "Dennyplane" with its signature model engine "Dennymite" developed by engineer Walter Righter, in addition to the "Denny Jr." which child actors would enter in model plane competitions at Mines Field, which later became Los Angeles International Airport. 

In 1935, Denny began developing his remote controlled "radioplane" for military use. In 1939, he and his partners won the first military United States Army Air Corps contract for their radio-controlled target drone, the Radioplane OQ-2. In July 1940, they formed the Radioplane Company and manufactured nearly fifteen thousand drones for the U.S. Army during the Second World War. The company was purchased by Northrop in 1952.

Denny had a great deal in common with Robert Loraine, an older actor/airman. They had been in a West End production together in 1902 in London, they were both veterans of the Royal Flying Corps (and its successor, the Royal Air Force) and were both still flying and making films in Hollywood in the 1930s.

Personal life
 
Denny married actress Irene Hilda Haismann on 28 January 1913 in Calcutta; both were with the Bandmann Opera Company. They had one daughter but were divorced in 1928. Denny married actress Isabelle "Betsy Lee" Stiefel in 1928 and they had three children.

Death
Denny died on 16 June 1967, aged 75, after suffering a stroke whilst visiting his sister in his home town of Richmond, England. He was interred at Forest Lawn-Hollywood Hills Cemetery in Los Angeles, California. His four children and wife Isabelle (died 1996, aged 89) survived him.

Partial filmography

Silent

 Niobe (1915) as Cornelius Griffin
 The Melting Pot (1915) as Undetermined Role (uncredited)
 The Red Lantern (1919)
 Bringing Up Betty (1919) as Tom Waring
 The Oakdale Affair (1919) as Arthur Stockbridge
 A Dark Lantern (1920) as Prince Anton
 39 East (1920) as Napoleon Gibbs Jr.
 Paying the Piper (1921) as Keith Larne
 The Price of Possession (1921) as Robert Dawnay
 Experience (1921)
 Disraeli (1921) as Charles, Viscount Deeford
 Footlights (1921) as Brett Page
 The Beggar Maid (1921, Short) as the Earl of Winston / King Cophetua
 Tropical Love (1921) as the Drifter
 The Iron Trail (1921) as Dan Appleton
 Let's Go (1922, Short) as Kane Halliday / 'Kid' Roberts
 Round Two (1922, Short) as Kane 'Kid Roberts' Halliday
 Sherlock Holmes (1922) as Prince Alexis
 Payment Through the Nose (1922, Short) as Kane Halliday / Kid Roberts
 The Leather Pushers (1922) as Kane Halliday / Kid Roberts
 A Fool and His Money (1922, Short) as Kane Halliday / Kid Roberts
 The Taming of the Shrewd (1922, Short) as Kane Halliday / Kid Roberts
 Whipsawed (1922, Short) as Kane Halliday / Kid Roberts
 Never Let Go (1922, Short) as Campbell - the Mountie
 The Jaws of Steel (1922, Short) as Cpl. Haldene, N.W.M.P.
 Plain Grit (1922, Short)
 The Kentucky Derby (1922) as Donald Gordon
 Young King Cole (1922, Short) as Kane Halliday / Kid Roberts
 He Raised Kane (1922) as Kane Halliday / Kid Roberts
 The Chickasha Bone Crusher (1923, Short) as Kane Halliday / Kid Roberts
 When Kane Met Abel (1923, Short) as Kane Halliday / Kid Roberts
 Strike Father, Strike Son (1923, Short) as Kane Halliday / Kid Roberts
 Joan of Newark (1923, Short) as Kane Halliday / Kid Roberts
 The Abysmal Brute (1923) as Pat Glendon, Jr
 The Wandering Two (1923, Short) as Kane Halliday / Kid Roberts
 The Widower's Mite (1923, Short) as Kane Halliday / Kid Roberts
 Don Coyote (1923, Short) as Kane Halliday / Kid Roberts
 Something for Nothing (1923, Short) as Kane Halliday / Kid Roberts
 Columbia, the Gem, and the Ocean (1923, Short) as Kane Halliday / Kid Roberts
 Barnaby's Grudge (1923, Short) as Kane Halliday / Kid Roberts
 The Thrill Chaser (1924) as Cameo appearance
 Sporting Youth (1924) as Jimmy Wood
 The Reckless Age (1924) as Dick Minot
 The Fast Worker (1924) as Terry Brock
 Oh Doctor! (1925) as Rufus Billings Jr.
 I'll Show You the Town (1925) as Alec Dupree
 Where Was I? (1925) as Thomas S. Berford
 California Straight Ahead (1925) as Tom Hayden
 What Happened to Jones (1926) as Tom Jones
 Skinner's Dress Suit (1926) as Skinner
 Rolling Home (1926) as Nat Alden
 Take It from Me (1926) as Tom Eggett
 The Cheerful Fraud (1926) as Sir Michael Fairlie
 Fast and Furious (1927) as Tom Brown
 Out All Night (1927) as John Graham
 On Your Toes (1927) as Elliott Beresford
 That's My Daddy (1927) as James 'Jimmy' Norton
 Good Morning, Judge (1928) as Freddie Grey
 The Night Bird (1928) as Kid Davis (his last silent film)

Sound

 Red Hot Speed (1929) as Darrow
 Clear the Decks (1929) as Jack Armitage
 His Lucky Day (1929) as Charles Blaydon
 One Hysterical Night (1929) as William 'Napoleon' Judd
 Embarrassing Moments (1930) as Thaddeus Cruikshank
 What a Man! (1930) as Wade Rawlins
 Madam Satan (1930) as Bob Brooks
 Those Three French Girls (1930) as Larry
 A Lady's Morals (1930) as Paul Brandt
 Oh, for a Man! (1930) as Barney McGann
 Parlor, Bedroom and Bath (1931) as Jeffrey Haywood
 Kiki (1931) as Victor Randall
 Stepping Out (1931) as Tom Martin
 Private Lives (1931) as Victor
 Strange Justice (1932) as Judson
 The Iron Master (1933) as Steve Mason
 The Barbarian (1933) as Gerald Hume - Diana's Fiancée
 The Big Bluff (1933)
 Only Yesterday (1933) as Bob
 Fog (1933) as Dr. Winstay
 The Lost Patrol (1934) as Brown
 Dancing Man (1934) as Paul Drexel
 The World Moves On (1934) as Erik von Gerhardt
 Of Human Bondage (1934) as Griffiths
 We're Rich Again (1934) as Bookington 'Bookie' Wells
 One More River (1934) as David Dornford
 The Richest Girl in the World (1934) as Phillip Lockwood
 The Little Minister (1934) as Captain Halliwell
 Lottery Lover (1935) as Capt. Payne
 Without Children (1935) as Phil Graham
 Vagabond Lady (1935) as John 'Johnny' Spear
 No More Ladies (1935) as Oliver
 Here's to Romance (1935) as Emery Gerard
 Anna Karenina (1935) as Yashvin
 The Lady in Scarlet (1935) as Oliver Keith
 Remember Last Night? (1935) as Jake Whitridge
 Midnight Phantom (1935) as Prof. David Graham
 The Preview Murder Mystery (1936) as Johnny Morgan
 It Couldn't Have Happened - But It Did (1936) as Greg Stone
 Romeo and Juliet (1936) as Benvolio - Nephew to Montgue and Friend to Romeo
 Two in a Crowd (1936) as James Stewart Anthony
 More Than a Secretary (1936) as Bill Houston
 We're in the Legion Now! (1936) as Dan Linton
 Bulldog Drummond Escapes (1937) as Algy Longworth
 Join the Marines (1937) as Steve Lodge
 Women of Glamour (1937) as Fritz 'Frederick' Eagan
 Let's Get Married (1937) as George Willoughby
 The Great Gambini (1937) as William Randall
 Jungle Menace (1937, Serial) as Ralph Marshall [Chs.1-3]
 Bulldog Drummond Comes Back (1937) as Algy Longworth
 Beg, Borrow or Steal (1937) as Clifton Summitt
 Bulldog Drummond's Revenge (1937) as Algy Longworth
 Bulldog Drummond's Peril (1938) as Algy Longworth
 Four Men and a Prayer (1938) as Capt. Douglas Loveland
 Blockade (1938) as Edward Grant
 Bulldog Drummond in Africa (1938) as Algy Longworth
 Arrest Bulldog Drummond (1938) as Algy Longworth
 Bulldog Drummond's Secret Police (1939) as Algy Longworth
 Everybody's Baby (1939) as Dr. Pilcoff
 Bulldog Drummond's Bride (1939) as Algy Longworth
 Rebecca (1940) as Frank Crawley
 Spring Parade (1940) as the Major
 Seven Sinners (1940) as Captain Church
 One Night in Lisbon (1941) as Erich Strasser
 International Squadron (1941) as Wing Commander Severn
 Appointment for Love (1941) as Michael Dailey
 Captains of the Clouds (1942) as Commanding Officer
 Sherlock Holmes and the Voice of Terror (1942) as Sir Evan Barham
 Eyes in the Night (1942) as Stephen Lawry
 Thunder Birds (1942) as Barrett
 Over My Dead Body (1942) as Richard 'Dick' Brenner
 The Crime Doctor's Strangest Case (1943) as Paul Ashley
 Song of the Open Road (1944) as Director Curtis
 Love Letters (1945) as Defense Counsel Phillips
 Tangier (1946) as Fernandez
 The Locket (1946) as Mr. Wendell
 My Favorite Brunette (1947) as James Collins
 The Macomber Affair (1947) as Police Inspector
 The Secret Life of Walter Mitty (1947) as Colonel
 Christmas Eve (1947) as Phillip Hastings
 Escape Me Never (1947) as Mr. MacLean
 Mr. Blandings Builds His Dream House (1948) as Simms
 The Iroquois Trail (1950) as Capt. Edward Brownell
 Fort Vengeance (1953) as Inspector Trevett
 Abbott and Costello Meet Dr. Jekyll and Mr. Hyde (1953) as Inspector
 World for Ransom (1954) as Maj. Ian Bone
 Sabaka (1954) as Sir Cedric
 Escape to Burma (1955) as Commissioner
 The Donald O'Connor Show (NBC) (1955) as Himself 
 Around the World in 80 Days (1956) as Bombay Police Inspector
 Cat Ballou (1965) as Sir Harry Percival
 Batman Series TV (1966, episodes 11 and 12) as King Boris
 Assault on a Queen (1966) as Master-at-Arms
 Batman (1966) as Commodore Schmidlapp (final acting role)

References

External links

Prince of Drones: The Reginald Denny Story by Kimberly Pucci (Bearmanor Media, 2019) 

Photographs and literature

Archive.org cache of UAV history site showing the Radioplane

1891 births
1967 deaths
Military personnel from Surrey
Burials in California
Male actors from London
Burials at Forest Lawn Memorial Park (Hollywood Hills)
British Army personnel of World War I
English aviators
English male film actors
English male silent film actors
English male stage actors
English male television actors
English expatriates in the United States
Male actors from Surrey
Royal Air Force officers
20th-century English male actors
Royal Flying Corps officers
Royal Air Force personnel of World War I
Silent film comedians
Aircraft designers
British expatriate male actors in the United States
20th-century English businesspeople